Kaitlin De Guzman (born ) is a Filipino-American female artistic gymnast. She competed at international competitions for the Philippines including the 2017 Southeast Asian Games in Kuala Lumpur, where she won the gold in uneven bars.

She also competed in gymnastics competitions in the United States, including the 2016 P&G Championships in St. Louis, Mo., the 2016 and 2015 Secret U.S. Classic, and the 2015 and 2014 editions of the Nastia Liukin Cup in Greensboro, N.C. 

She is the daughter of Cintamoni De Guzman, the country's gold medalist in the uneven bars event during the 1995 Southeast Asian Games in Chiang Mai. The elder De Guzman also took part in the 1997 Southeast Asian Games in Jakarta, where she won a gold medal in the team event.

National Competition Results
 2016 P&G Championships, St. Louis, Mo. -
 2016 Secret U.S. Classic, Hartford, Conn. -
 2015 Secret U.S. Classic, Chicago, Ill. - (Jr. Div.)
 2015 Women's Junior Olympic Level 10 National Championships, Des Moines, Iowa - 2nd-BB (T) (Jr. B)
 2015 Nastia Liukin Cup, Arlington, Texas - 5th-FX; 8th-BB (T) (Jr. Div.)
 2014 Women's Junior Olympic Level 10 National Championships, Jackson, Miss. - 1st-BB; 3rd-AA; 5th-UB (Jr. A)
 2014 Level 10 Regionals - 2nd AA, 2nd UB, 2nd BB, 5th FX (Jr. A)
 2014 Level 10 State - 1st AA, 1st BB, 2nd FX, 2nd UB
 2014 Nastia Liukin Cup, Greensboro, N.C. - (Jr. Div.)
 2013 Level 9 Westerns - 1st Bars, 2nd-Beam, 4th-AA
 2013 Level 9 Regionals - 1st-Bars, 8th-AA, 8th-VT
 2013 Level 9 State - 1st-AA, 1st-UB, 1st-BB, 2nd-FX, 4th-VT

References

2000 births
Living people
Filipino female artistic gymnasts
Southeast Asian Games gold medalists for the Philippines
Southeast Asian Games silver medalists for the Philippines
Southeast Asian Games bronze medalists for the Philippines
Southeast Asian Games medalists in gymnastics
Competitors at the 2017 Southeast Asian Games